Ohmiya Dam is a gravity dam located in Tottori prefecture in Japan. The dam is used for power production. The catchment area of the dam is 64.9 km2. The dam impounds about 11  ha of land when full and can store 495 thousand cubic meters of water. The construction of the dam was completed in 1940.

References

Dams in Tottori Prefecture
1940 establishments in Japan